The balcony scene from Romeo and Juliet was staged by Sean Lavery, assistant to the ballet master in chief at New York City Ballet to Prokofiev's Romeo and Juliet (1934–1940). The premiere took place 24 February 1991 at the New York State Theater, Lincoln Center.

Cast
The original cast consisted of Judith Fugate and Peter Boal.

NYCB revivals

Reviews 
Ballet Magazine review by Eric Taub, August 2005
Explore Dance review by Dr. Roberta E. Zlokower, 21 January 2006 
NY Times review by Alastair Macaulay, 6 June 2007

Ballets by Sean Lavery
Ballets by Sergei Prokofiev
1991 ballet premieres
Ballets based on Romeo and Juliet
New York City Ballet repertory